Armillaria ostoyae (synonym Armillaria solidipes) is a species of fungus (mushroom), pathogenic to trees, in the family Physalacriaceae. In the western United States, it is the most common variant of the group of species under the name Armillaria mellea. A. ostoyae is common on both hardwood and conifer wood in forests west of the Cascade Range in Oregon, United States. It has decurrent gills and the stipe has a ring. The mycelium invades the sapwood and is able to disseminate over great distances under the bark or between trees in the form of black rhizomorphs ("shoestrings"). In most areas of North America, Armillaria ostoyae can be separated from other species by its physical features: cream-brown colors, prominent cap scales, and a well-developed stem ring distinguish it from other Armillaria.

Armillaria ostoyae grows and spreads primarily underground, such that the bulk of the organism is not visible from the surface. In the autumn, the subterranean parts of the organism bloom "honey mushrooms" as surface fruits. Low competition for land and nutrients often allow this fungus to grow to huge proportions, and it possibly covers more total geographical area than any other single living organism.

Taxonomy

The species was long known as Armillaria ostoyae Romagn., until a 2008 publication revealed that the species had been described under the earlier name Armillaria solidipes by Charles Horton Peck in 1900, long before Henri Romagnesi had described it in 1970. Subsequently, a proposal to conserve the name Armillaria ostoyae was published in 2011 and has been approved by the Nomenclature Committee for Fungi. This fungus harms conifer trees in the U.S and Canada.

Life cycle, genetics, and mass
This fungus, like most parasitic fungi, reproduces sexually. The fungi begin life as spores, released into the environment by a mature mushroom. Armillaria ostoyae has a white spore print. There are two mating types for spores (not male and female but similar in effect). Spores can be dispersed by environmental factors such as wind, or they can be redeposited by an animal. Once the spores are in a resting state, the single spore must come in contact with a spore of a complementary mating type and of the same species. If the single spore isolates are from different species, the colonies will not fuse together and they will remain separate. When two isolates of the same species but different mating types fuse together, they soon form coalesced colonies which become dark brown and flat. With this particular fungus it will produce mycelial cords – the shoestrings – also known as rhizomorphs. These rhizomorphs allow the fungus to obtain nutrients over distances. These are also the main factors to its pathogenicity. As the fruiting body continues to grow and obtain nutrients, it forms into a mature mushroom. Armillaria ostoyae in particular grows wide and thin sheet-like plates radiating from the stem which is known as its gills. The gills hold the spores of a mature mushroom. This is stained white when seen as a spore print. Once spore formation is complete, this signifies a mature mushroom and now is able to spread its spores to start a new generation.

Genetics and mass
Using genotyping and clonal analysis, scientists determined that a 2500-year old specimen of Armillaria ostoyae in northern Michigan, United States originated from spores of a parent fungus in Ontario, Canada, then grew over millennia into the 21st century to a mass of 440 tons (4 x 105 kg), making it the equivalent in weight of 3 blue whales. It is currently the world's largest single living organism.

Pathogenicity
The disease is of particular interest to forest managers, as the species is highly pathogenic to a number of commercial softwoods, notably Douglas-fir (Pseudotsuga menziesii), true firs (Abies spp.), pine trees (Pinus), and Western Hemlock (Tsuga heterophylla). A commonly prescribed treatment is the clear cutting of an infected stand followed by planting with more resistant species such as Western redcedar (Thuja plicata) or deciduous seedlings.

Pathogenicity is seen to differ among trees of varying age and location. Younger conifer trees at age 10 and below are more susceptible to infection leading to mortality, with an increased chance of survival against the fungus where mortality can become rare by age 20. While mortality among older conifers is less likely to occur, this does happen, however, in forests with dryer climates.

The pathogenicity of Armillaria ostoyae appears to be more common in interior stands, but its virulence is seen to be greater in coastal conifers. Although conifers along the coastal regions show a lower rate of mortality against the root disease, infections can be much worse. Despite differences in how infections occur between these two regions, infections are generally established by rhizomorph strands, and pathogenicity is correlated to rhizomorph production.

Geography
Armillaria ostoyae is mostly common in the cooler regions of the northern hemisphere. In North America, this fungus is found on host coniferous trees in the forests of British Columbia and the Pacific Northwest. It also grows in parts of Asia. While Armillaria ostoyae is distributed throughout the different biogeoclimatic zones of British Columbia, the root disease causes the greatest problem in the interior parts of the region in the Interior Cedar Hemlock biogeoclimatic zone. It is both present in the interior where it is more common as well as along the coast.

This organism is estimated to be some 8,000 years old and may weigh as much as 35,000 tons. If this colony is considered a single organism, it is one of the largest known organisms in the world by area, only knowingly rivalled by a colony of Posidonia australis on the Australian seabed that measures ,  and rivals the aspen grove "Pando" as the known organism with the highest living biomass.

Diagnosis
A tree is diagnosed with this parasitic fungus once the following characteristics are identified:
Resin flow from tree base
Crown thinning or changing color to yellow or red
Distress crop of cones
White mycelial fan under bark
Black rhizomorphs penetrating root surfaces
Honey-colored mushrooms near base of tree in fall
Affected trees often in groups or patches on the east side of the Cascades; usually killed singly on the west side.
A. ostoyae may be confused with Mottled rot (Pholiota limonella). It has similar mushrooms, but only if mycelial fans are not present.
Dead and diseased trees usually occur in disease centers, which appear as openings in the canopy. GPS tracking can aid in the monitoring of these areas. However, sometimes distinct centers will be absent and diseased trees are scattered throughout the stand.

Treatment

Armillaria can remain viable in stumps for 50 years. Chemical treatments do not eradicate the fungus entirely, and they are not cost-effective. The most frequent and effective approach to managing root disease problems is to attempt to control them at final harvest by replanting site-suited tree species that are disease tolerant. In eastern Washington that typically means replacing Douglas-fir or true fir stands with ponderosa pine, western larch, western white pine, lodgepole pine, western red cedar, alder, or spruce. Species susceptibility varies somewhat from location to location. All trees in the disease center as well as uninfected trees within  should be cut. No tree from a highly susceptible species should be planted within  of a disease center.

The use of another fungus, Hypholoma fasciculare has been shown in early experiments to competitively exclude Armillaria ostoyae in both field and laboratory conditions, but further experimentation is required to establish the efficacy of this treatment.

Another more expensive alternative to changing species is to remove diseased stumps and trees from the site by pushing them out with a bulldozer. The air will dry and kill the fungus. Any small roots left underground will decay before they can reinfect the new seedlings, so it is not necessary to burn the stumps. After stump removal, any species may be planted. The removal of stumps (stumping) has been used to prevent contact between infected stumps and newer growth resulting in lower infection rates. It is unknown if the lower infection rates will persist as roots of young trees extend closer to the original inoculate from the preceding stand.

The most important control measure after planting is to manage for reduced tree stress. This includes regulating species composition, maintaining biological diversity, and reducing the chances for insect pest buildup. Mixed-species forests are more resistant to insect defoliation, and also slow the spread of species-specific pests such as dwarf mistletoe, which are both predisposing agents for Armillaria.

Uses
The species is considered a choice edible.

See also

Largest organisms
List of Armillaria species
List of bioluminescent fungi

References

External links

Humungous Fungus: World's Largest Organism?
Fantastic fungus find at BBC News
The Humongous Fungus – Ten Years Later at Inoculum 
Early Results from Field Trials Using Hypholoma fasciculare to Reduce Armillaria ostoyae Root Disease in Canadian Journal of Botany (2004)

ostoyae
Bioluminescent fungi
Edible fungi
Fungi of Europe
Fungi of North America
Natural history of Oregon
Natural history of Washington (state)
Fungal tree pathogens and diseases
Fungi described in 1900